Disperse Yellow 42, or 4-anilino-3-nitrobenzenesulfonanilide, is a disperse dye that is primarily used to dye polyester fibers. It is prepared by the reaction of two equivalents of aniline with 4-chloro-3-nitrobenzenesulfonyl chloride. An estimated 10,000 tons were prepared in 1990, making Disperse Yellow 42 the nitro dye produced on the largest scale.

References

 
Dyes
Sulfonamides